25 is an album by Harry Connick Jr., released on November 24, 1992. It is a collection of jazz and pop standards performed on solo piano. The title refers to his age at the time he recorded it.

Track listing
"Stardust" (Hoagy Carmichael, Mitchell Parish) – (with Ellis Marsalis) 
"Music, Maestro, Please" (Herbert Magidson, Allie Wrubel)
"On The Street Where You Live" (Alan Jay Lerner, Frederick Loewe)
"After You've Gone" (Henry Creamer, Turner Layton)
"I'm An Old Cowhand (From The Rio Grande)" (Johnny Mercer)
"Moment's Notice" (John Coltrane)
"Tangerine" (Johnny Mercer, Victor Schertzinger)
"Didn't He Ramble" (Harry Bolton)
"Caravan" (Duke Ellington, Irving Mills, Juan Tizol)
"Lazybones" (Hoagy Carmichael, Johnny Mercer) – (with Johnny Adams) 
"Muskrat Ramble" (Ray Gilbert, Kid Ory)
"This Time the Dream's on Me" (Harold Arlen, Johnny Mercer)
"On the Atchison, Topeka and the Santa Fe" (Johnny Mercer, Harry Warren) – (with Ray Brown and Ned Goold)

Musicians
Harry Connick Jr. – Piano, Hammond Organ (Track # 10), Vocals 
Ellis Marsalis – Piano (track # 1)
Johnny Adams – Vocals (track # 10)
Ned Goold – Tenor Sax (track # 13)
Ray Brown – Bass (track # 13)

Certifications

References

External links
 25, at harryconnickjr.com

1992 albums
Harry Connick Jr. albums
Columbia Records albums